Victory Heights is a residential suburb of Kalgoorlie-Boulder, a city in the Eastern Goldfields region of Western Australia. At the 2016 census it had a population of 893 people, down from 908 at the 2011 census.

Geography
Victory Heights is bounded by Millen Street and Johnston Street to the north, Gatacre Drive to the west, Burt Street to the south, and Ivanhoe Street to the east. The two residential areas of the suburb (a larger western area and a smaller eastern area) are divided by Gribble Creek, an ephemeral waterway with bushland on both sides.

History
Victory Heights was established by the Boulder Municipal Council after World War II to fill a housing shortage. The development was constructed on land bought from the federal government, which had previously been used to house servicemen working at RAAF Base Kalgoorlie. Victory Heights was officially opened in March 1947 by John Teahan, the Mayor of Boulder,  with the subdivision's name having been chosen by local schoolchildren the previous year.

References